Zarrinabad District is a district (bakhsh) in Dehloran County, Ilam Province, Iran. At the 2006 census, its population was 10,407, in 1,999 families.  The District has two cities: Meymeh and Pahleh.  The District has two rural districts (dehestan): Seyyed Ebrahim Rural District and Seyyed Nasereddin Rural District.

References 

Districts of Ilam Province
Dehloran County